Pincus Leff (May 2, 1907 – April 3, 1993), better known as  Pinky Lee, was an American burlesque comic and host of the children's television program The Pinky Lee Show in the early 1950s.

Biography
Born in Saint Paul, Minnesota, Lee got his start in show business in the 1920s as a tap dancer in the chorus of the Brodrick-Felsen & Co. vaudeville act, traveling on the Keith Orpheum circuit. Later, he worked as a comic of the "baggy pants" variety on stage, becoming an expert at the slapstick, comic dancing, and rapid-fire jokes of the burlesque style. During the 1940s, he was heard on Drene Time and other radio programs.

Easily recognized by his trademark lisp and high-energy antics, his signature costume was a loud plaid suit with baggy checkered pants and an undersized hat. During his routines, whenever anybody irritated him (which happened frequently) he would unleash his catchphrase: "Oooooh! You make me so mad!"

Television
In 1950, he had his own 30-minute primetime variety television series on NBC, The Pinky Lee Show, featuring vaudevillians and burlesque comics. In 1951–52 he starred with Vivian Blaine in a 15-minute sitcom, Those Two.

He returned on January 4, 1954, with The Pinky Lee Show, a children's show sponsored by Tootsie Roll. An Emmy-nominated afternoon children's program that spawned later imitators such as Pee-Wee's Playhouse, it was followed each day by the popular Howdy Doody Show.  Lee opened each show with his trademark theme song, "Yoo Hoo, It's Me!":
Yoo hoo, it's me,
My name is Pinky Lee.
I skip and run bring lots of fun
To every he and she.
It's plain to see
That you can tell it's me
With my checkered hat
And my checkered coat,
The funny giggle in my throat
And my silly dance
Like a billy goat.
Put 'em all together,
Put 'em all together,
And it's whooooo?
(Audience): PINKY!!!!!

Others in the cast: Betty Jane Howarth, Jimmy Brown, Molly Bee, Jack McCoy, Mel Koontz, Cindy Sue, Susabelle, Ken Mayer, Isabel Dwan, Sidney Fields, Margie Lizst, Milton Newberger and Jymme Shore. Adding to the show's bounce and style was its musical director and master organist Gaylord Carter, who underscored every moment with appropriate accompaniment.

In September 1955, Lee collapsed on camera during a live show due to illness. His normal antics were so energetic that apparently the cameraman and the show's director assumed the fall an ad lib part of his performance.  The "Peanut Gallery", an audience usually composed almost entirely of pre-adolescent children who were coached by a staff member, continued their enthusiastic cheering and applause from the on-stage bleachers.  After as much as ten seconds of writhing by the stricken Lee, the camera abruptly panned to the still-cheering audience.  The following afternoons Pinky Lee was not present.  This effectively ended his leading role on the show, which continued without him until June 9, 1956.

Rumors that he had died of a heart attack, prompted by the incident, persisted for decades. Occasionally, newspaper items mentioned the "late" Lee – even though he was performing at a dinner theater in the same city as one of the reporting newspapers. The incident also spawned rumors that Lee had been institutionalized after going insane on live television.

In 1957, Lee hosted The Gumby Show, the original appearance of that claymation character. In 1963, Lee attempted a return to kids' TV, hosting a local children's comedy program on KABC-TV in Los Angeles. This series was nationally syndicated for the 1964–65 TV seasons, but the program fell prey to creative interference from the show's producers and station management. Lee fought the interference, but his efforts were for naught. The Pinky Lee Kids TV Show went off the air after one season. One episode was released on DVD/VHS by Shokus Video, and a DVD with two episodes was released by Alpha Video.

Lee returned to television in 1983, appearing on NBC's Yummy Awards, a mock awards show hosted by Ricky Schroder that honored the best children's TV programming of the year.

Movies and Theater
Lee can be seen in films, including Lady of Burlesque, Earl Carroll Vanities, Pals of the Golden West, South of Caliente, and Blonde Ransom; and Lee appeared on television shows, including Ed Sullivan's Toast of the Town.

Lee also appeared in regional theaters throughout the U.S. in Sugar Babies and other shows in the late 1980s.

Filmography

Film

Personal life
Lee was married to Bebe (née Beatrice Dancis), with whom he had two children, Patricia Bonnie Lee and Morgan David Lee.  Lee's brother-in-law was well-known Tin Pan Alley songwriter Al Sherman.  Lee was also the uncle of the Sherman Brothers, Robert and Richard, with whom he also worked from time to time in the 1950s.

Later years and death
In later years, Lee worked as a teacher and appeared in regional musical theater productions. He died in 1993 in Mission Viejo, California. His interment was at Mount Sinai Memorial Park Cemetery.

Watch
 A 1954 episode of The Pinky Lee Show

Legacy

 In Grease, Rizzo remarks, "To you from me, Pinky Lee!", after she throws Kenickie's milkshake in his face.
 Gene Kelly plays dancing comic Pinky Benson in What a Way to Go! (1964)
 In a third-season episode of The Golden Girls, Sophia Petrillo describes how her friend Lillian thinks "she is Pinky Lee." 
 In a first-season episode of Night Court, Dan Fielding remarks that Judge Stone's age is one of the things he never wonders about, "like is Pinky Lee still alive?"  Broadcast in 1984, the answer at the time was "yes".
 Lee is referenced in the 2013 posthumously released autobiography of Robert B. Sherman, Moose: Chapters from My Life in the chapters entitled, "Wee Stinky (Part 1)" and "Wee Stinky (Part 2)".
 Lee along with Rosie (Rosemary) Clooney and Red Skelton are mentioned as targets of the Chad Mitchell Trio's satirical "The John Birch Society" song.
 Lee's collapse on stage was spoofed on The Simpsons in the 1990 episode where "Krusty Gets Busted". A clip is shown of Krusty the Clown having a heart attack while performing. The children watching laugh and cheer while Krusty is writhing and groaning, "I'm dying. I'm dying."
In the 1987 film Bride of Boogedy, Pinky Lee's name is mentioned in a fake seance as a possible spirit to contact (along with Alexander the Great and Julius Caesar), even though Pinky Lee is still alive and didn't die until 1993.
He was also an inspiration for the Pee Wee Herman character

References

External links

 Pinky Lee Show at TV Party
 
 

1907 births
1993 deaths
American male comedians
Vaudeville performers
American male television actors
Jewish male comedians
Jewish American male actors
People from Mission Viejo, California
Burials at Mount Sinai Memorial Park Cemetery
20th-century American male actors
Comedians from California
Comedians from Minnesota
20th-century American comedians
20th-century American Jews